The National Rural and Family Magazine  was a weekly newspaper published in Chicago, Illinois in 1898 and into the early 20th century. It was formerly published as Western Rural before changing its name.

References

External links 
 Chronicling America: The National Rural and Family Magazine
 Illinois Digital Newspaper Collections: National Rural and Family Magazine (1898-1900)

Defunct newspapers published in Chicago
Publications established in 1898
Weekly newspapers published in the United States